Sardar Muhammad Shamim Khan (born 1 January 1958) is a Pakistani jurist who served as the 48th Chief Justice of Lahore High Court from 1 January 2019 to 31 December 2019.

References

	

	
	

1958 births
Living people
Judges of the Lahore High Court
Pakistani judges